Wolfgang Behringer (born 17 July 1956 in Munich) is a German historian specialising in the witchcraft beliefs of Early Modern Europe. He has worked at the University of Munich, University of York and the University of Bonn as well as published multiple books. He is the author of the book Shaman of Oberstdorf. He also authored A Cultural History of Climate. First published in German in 2000, it was translated into English in 2009. Since 2003, Behringer teaches at Saarland University.

Works

Criticism
Behringer's book, A Cultural History of Climate makes numerous negative references to climate scientists, which has resulted in concerns of factual inaccuracies and possible bias. For example, page 14 of the original version of the book in German depicts a cartoon from controversial cartoonist Götz Weidenroth depicting climate scientists financially profiting from speaking up about the anthropogenic causes of climate change. On page 104 he makes reference to 3 °C temperature increase in springtime temperatures in the early Middle Ages (1170 to 1310) in Europe and then compares this to an apparently lower rise in temperatures between 1891 and 1960. Without providing references this seems to be cherry picking of the data in order to make an unsubstantiated claim. Furthermore, on page 288 Behringer makes the claim that climate change has been historically good for humanity while appealing for calm. He claims that we will simply adapt to a changing climate without citing any scientific sources.

An extensive critique of Behringer's book has recently been published on the peer-reviewed Journal of Environmental Studies and Sciences.

References

20th-century German historians
Microhistorians
German male non-fiction writers
Living people
1956 births
21st-century German historians
Academic staff of Saarland University